Julio Cesar Green (born May 19, 1967, in Las Terrenas) is a Dominican former professional boxer who held the WBA middleweight title.

Green turned pro in 1990 and in 1995, landed a shot at the vacant World Boxing Association (WBA) light middleweight title against Carl Daniels. Green lost a decision, but in 1997, got a shot at WBA middleweight titleholder William Joppy. Green upset Joppy via decision, but lost the title in a rematch against Joppy in his next fight. In 1999, Green got a shot at the interim WBA middleweight title against Darren Obah and won via technical knockout (TKO). He faced Joppy for the full WBA middleweight title later that year and again lost to him. In 2002 he got his last shot at a title, losing via 4th round TKO against WBA super middleweight titleholder Byron Mitchell. Green retired in 2004.

Professional boxing record

References

External links
 

1967 births
Living people
Middleweight boxers
World boxing champions
Dominican Republic male boxers